Shree Chhatrapati Shivaji Market Yard, known locally as ‘Market Yard’, is a wholesale market for agricultural produce like vegetables, fruits and flowers in Pune city. It is located near Gultekdi in Maharshi Nagar and close to Swargate. It is an important commercial area.

Governance and administration
A board of directors is elected according to the provisions of Maharashtra Agricultural Produce Marketing (Development and Regulation) Act, 1963, and rules under the act, of 1967, which consists of a chairman, a deputy chairman, a Secretary of the Market Committee and other Members.

Facilities provided by the Agricultural Produce Market Committee:
 Plots for sale of agricultural produce
 Water & electricity
 Public rest rooms
 Petrol pump
 Weighing scale of 3 - 5 tons capacity
 Live feed of market prices of all agricultural commodities of all the market societies in Maharashtra
 Farmers' guest house
 Grievance center
 Provision of additional land in the event of surplus production
 Free first aid center

History
The wholesale market was originally located at ‘khalchi mandai’ in Budhwar peth. The then Chief Minister Sharad Pawar, shifted the APMC market in 1980 to its present location, in order to expand the vegetable and fruit supply throughout Pune city. This was brought about by the efforts of Murlidhar Pandharinath Ghule, a trader in the old APMC market.

Transport
PMPML buses connect Market Yard to various parts in the city. Market Yard is one of the important bus depots in Pune. Trucks and tempos are used for goods transport in this area.

Commercial Importance 
The Market Yard in Pune is an important location for trade and commerce for wholesalers and retailers of grains and other grocery items. Home to over 1000+ businesses, it is spread over a 10 square kilometers area, at the southern end of the city.

See also 
Swargate

References

External links
 http://www.puneapmc.org/index.html

Retail markets in Pune
Monuments and memorials to Shivaji